The Fokas method, or unified transform, is an algorithmic procedure for analysing boundary value problems for linear partial differential equations and for an important class of nonlinear PDEs belonging to the so-called integrable systems. It is named after Greek mathematician Athanassios S. Fokas.

Traditionally, linear boundary value problems are analysed using either integral transforms and infinite series, or by employing appropriate fundamental solutions.

Integral transforms and infinite series

For example, the Dirichlet problem of the heat equation on the half-line, i.e., the problem

 and  given, can be solved via the sine-transform. The analogous problem on a finite interval can be solved via an infinite series. However, the solutions obtained via integral transforms and infinite series have several disadvantages:
1. The relevant representations are not uniformly convergent at the boundaries.

2. The above representations are unsuitable for numerical computations. This fact is a direct consequence of 1.

3. There exist traditional integral transforms and infinite series representations only for a very limited class of boundary value problems. For example, there does not exist the analogue of the sine-transform for solving the following simple problem:   supplemented with the initial and boundary conditions .

For evolution PDEs, the Fokas method:
 Constructs representations which are always uniformly convergent at the boundaries.
 These representations can be used in a straightforward way, for example using MATLAB, for the numerical evaluation of the solution.
 Constructs representations for evolution PDEs with spatial derivatives of any order.
In addition, the Fokas method constructs representations which are always of the form of the Ehrenpreis fundamental principle.

Fundamental solutions
However, these representations involve both the Dirichlet and the Neumann boundary values, thus since only one of these boundary values is known from the given data, the above representations are not effective. In order to obtain an effective representation, one needs to characterize the generalized Dirichlet to Neumann map; for example, for the Dirichlet problem one needs to obtain the Neumann boundary value in terms of the given Dirichlet datum.

For elliptic PDEs, the Fokas method:
 Provides an elegant formulation of the generalised Dirichlet to Neumann map by deriving an algebraic relation, called the global relation, which couples appropriate transforms of all boundary values.
 For simple domains and a variety of boundary conditions the global relation can be solved analytically.  Furthermore, for the case that  is an arbitrary convex polygon, the global relation can be solved numerically in a straightforward way, for example using MATLAB. Also, for the case that  is a convex polygon, the Fokas method constructs an integral representation in the Fourier complex plane. By using this representation together with the global relation it is possible to compute the solution numerically inside the polygon in a straightforward semi-analytic manner.

The forced heat equation on the half-line

Let  satisfy the forced heat equation

The unified transform involves the following three simple steps.

1. By employing the Fourier transform pair

  obtain the global relation. For equation , we find

  This step is similar with the first step used for the traditional transforms. On the other hand, equation  is valid in the lower-half complex -plane, wheres the analogous equations for the sine and cosine transforms are valid only for  real. The Fokas method is based on the fact that equation  has a large domain of validity.

2. By using the inverse Fourier transform, the global relation yields an integral representation on the real line.
  where  is defined by the requirement that  solves the given PDE.  For equation , equations  and  imply

  where the contour  is depicted in figure 1.

In this case, where .

3. By using the global relation and by employing the transformations in the complex- plane which leave  invariant, it is possible to eliminate from the integral representation of  the transforms of the unknown boundary values. Using this transformation, equation  becomes

  If is important to note that the unknown term  does not contribute to the solution .

 
where

Uniform convergence
The unified transform constructs representations which are always uniformly convergent at the boundaries.

Numerical evaluation
It is straightforward to compute the solution numerically using quadrature after the contour has been deformed to ensure exponential decay of the integrand. For simplicity we concentrate on the case that the relevant transforms can be computed analytically. For example,

Then, equation  becomes

Thus, equation  becomes

and the rhs of the above equation can be computed using MATLAB.

For the details of effective numerical quadrature using the unified transform, we refer the reader to, which solves the advection-dispersion equation on the half-line. There it was found that the solution lends itself to quadrature (Gauss-Laguerre quadrature for exponential decay of integrand or Gauss–Hermite quadrature for squared exponential decay of integrand) with exponential convergence.

An Evolution Equation with Spatial Derivatives of Arbitrary order.
Suppose that  is a solution of the given PDE. Then,  is the boundary of the domain  defined earlier.

If the given PDE contain spatial derivatives of order , then for  even, the global relation involves  unknowns, whereas for  odd it involves  or  unknowns (depending on the coefficient of the highest derivative).

A Numerical Collocation Method

The Fokas method gives rise to a novel spectral collocation method occurring in Fourier space. Recent work has extended the method and demonstrated a number of its advantages; it avoids the computation of singular integrals encountered in more traditional boundary based approaches, it is fast and easy to code up, it can be used for separable PDEs where no Green's function is known analytically and it can be made to converge exponentially with the correct choice of basis functions.

Basic method in a convex bounded polygon
Suppose that  and  both satisfy Laplace's equation in the interior of a convex bounded polygon . It follows that

Then Green's theorem implies the relation

This leads to

where  denotes the normal derivative.

In order to further simplify the global relation, we introduce the complex variable , and its conjugate . We then choose the test function , leading to the global relation for Laplace's equation:

A similar argument can also be used in the presence of a forcing term (giving a non-zero right-hand side). An identical argument works for the Helmholtz equation

and the modified Helmholtz equation

Choosing respective test functions  and  lead to respective global relations

and

These three cases deal with more general second order elliptic constant coefficient PDEs through a suitable linear change of variables.

The Dirichlet to Neumann map for a convex polygon
Suppose that  is the interior of a bounded convex polygon specified by the corners . In this case, the global relation  takes the form

where

or

Hence,

The functions  and  can be approximated in terms of Legendre polynomials:

Equation  now becomes an approximate global relation, where

 can be computed numerically via  where  denotes the modified Bessel function of the first kind.

The global relation involves  unknown constants (for the Dirichlet problem, these constants are ).

Dealing with non-convexity

Whilst the global relation is valid for non-convex domains , the above collocation method becomes numerically unstable. A heuristic explanation for this ill-conditioning in the case of the Laplace equation is as follows. When using a sufficiently large selection of complex -values, located in all directions from the origin, each side of a convex polygon will for many of these -values encounter larger test functions than do the remaining sides. In contrast, for a non-convex polygon, boundary regions in indented regions will always be dominated by effects from other boundary parts, no matter the -value. This can easily be overcome by splitting up the domain into numerous convex regions (introducing fictitious boundaries) and matching the solution and normal derivative across these internal boundaries. Such splitting also allows the extension of the method to exterior/unbounded domains  (see below).

Evaluating in the domain interior

In the case of straight edges, Green's representation theorem leads to

Due to the orthogonality of the Legendre polynomials, for a given , the integrals in the above representation are Legendre expansion coefficients of certain analytic functions (written in terms of ). Hence the integrals can be computed rapidly (all at once) by expanding the functions in a Chebyshev basis (using the FFT) and then converting to a Legendre basis. This can also be used to approximate the `smooth' part of the solution after adding global singular functions to take care of corner singularities.

Extension to curved boundaries and separable PDEs

The method can be extended to variable coefficient PDEs and curved boundaries in the following manner (see ). Consider the formal PDE in divergence form:

Assume that the domain  is a bounded connected Lipschitz domain whose boundary consists of a finite number of vertices connected by  arcs.

The adjoint of equation  is given by

The expression  can be written in the form

Integrating across the domain and applying the divergence theorem we recover the global relation ( denotes the outward normal):

Define  along the curve  and assume that .

Using  , the global relation   becomes

For separable PDEs, a suitable one-parameter family of solutions  can be constructed. If we expand each  and its derivative  along the boundary  in Legendre polynomials, then we cover a similar approximate global relation as before. To compute the integrals that form the approximate global relation, we can use the same trick as before - expanding the function integrated against Legendre polynomials in a Chebyshev series and then converting to a Legendre series. A major advantage of the method in this scenario is that it is a boundary-based method which does not need any knowledge of the corresponding Green's function. Hence, it is more applicable than boundary integral methods in the setting of variable coefficients.

Singular functions and an exterior scattering problems

A major advantage of the above collocation method is that the basis choice (Legendre polynomials in the above discussion) can be flexibly chosen to capture local properties of the solution along each boundary.

where . The boundary condition along the plate is

for the incident field

By considering the domains  and  separately and matching the global relations, the global relation for this problem becomes

The complex collocation points are allowed precisely because of the radiation condition.

These have the following Fourier transform:

where  denotes the Bessel function of the first kind of order . For the derivative  along , a suitable basis choice are Bessel functions of fractional order (to capture the singularity and algebraic decay at infinity).

We introduce the dimensionless frequency , where  is the length of the plate. The figure below shows the convergence of the method for various . The maximum relative absolute error is the maximum error of the computed solution divided by the maximum absolute value of the solution. More complicated geometries (including different angles of touching boundaries and infinite wedges) can also be dealt with in a similar fashion as well as more complicated boundary conditions such as those modeling elasticity.

References 

Partial differential equations